Arsène Alancourt (29 February 1892 – 20 April 1965) was a French professional road bicycle racer. He won one stage in the 1924 Tour de France, and rode his best general classification in 1923 when he finished 5th.

Alancourt was born in Clichy, Hauts-de-Seine, Paris and also died there aged 63.

Major results

1922
13th Tour de France
1923
5th Tour de France
1924
7th Tour de France
1st Stage 13
1925
3rd Paris-Nancy
1926
2nd Paris-Contres
1927
1st GP Wolber
1st Paris-Vichy
1st Paris-Contres
3rd Paris-Rennes
1928
1st Stage 1, Tour du Sud-Est
2nd Paris-Caen
3rd Paris-Longwy

External links 

Official Tour de France results for Arsène Alancourt

French male cyclists
French Tour de France stage winners
Sportspeople from Clichy, Hauts-de-Seine
1892 births
1965 deaths
Cyclists from Île-de-France